Joseph Crandall (ca. 1761 – February 20, 1858) was a Baptist minister and political figure in New Brunswick. He represented Westmorland County in the Legislative Assembly from 1820 to 1822.

He was born in Tiverton, Rhode Island, the son of Webber Crandall and Mercy Vaughan, and came to Chester, Nova Scotia with his parents. After his father died, he went to Liverpool to work in the cod fishery and then worked for a time transporting lumber. He became a Baptist at the age of 35 after hearing Joseph Dimock and Harris Harding. After preaching in Nova Scotia and New Brunswick for a time, he became pastor for a church in Sackville and also established a church at Salisbury. He was elected to the province's legislative assembly in 1820 and 1821 but was forced to resign because he was a preacher. Crandall was named the first moderator for the New Brunswick Baptist Association in 1822. Crandall died in Salisbury. Crandall University in Moncton, New Brunswick is named for him.

His son David also became a Baptist minister, finishing his long career at the Baptist Church in Hatfield Point, New Brunswick.

External links
Biography at the Dictionary of Canadian Biography Online

1760s births
1858 deaths
People from Westmorland County, New Brunswick
19th-century Canadian Baptist ministers
Members of the Legislative Assembly of New Brunswick
Year of birth uncertain
Year of birth unknown
18th-century Canadian Baptist ministers
Colony of New Brunswick people